= Ibones de Anayet =

Group of lakes in Spain

Coordinates: 42°46′43″N 0°26′38″W

Ibones de Anayet are a series of lakes in the Province of Huesca, northeastern Spain. They lie at the foot of Pico de Anayet.

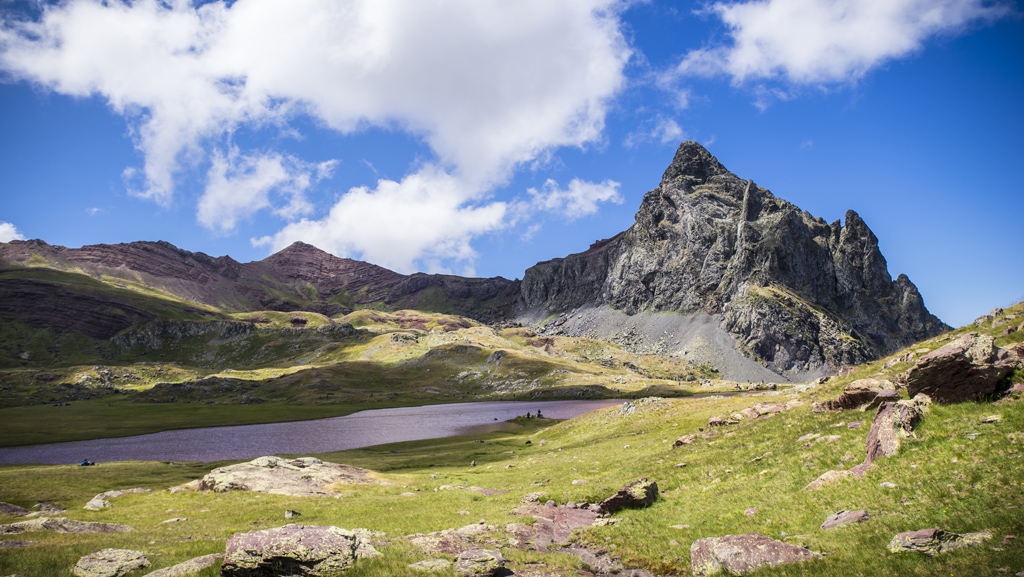
Fotografía de los ibones de Anayet tomada en el pirinéo aragonés a los pies del pico Anayet (2545m) en el municipio de Sallent de Gallego, realizada por el fotógrafo Adrian Sediles Embi.
